Pere López Agràs (born 13 October 1971) is an Andorran politician who served as acting prime minister of Andorra from April 28, 2011 until May 12, 2011.

References 

Heads of Government of Andorra
Finance Ministers of Andorra
People from Andorra la Vella
Living people
Social Democratic Party (Andorra) politicians
1971 births